The 2012–13 GFF National Super League is the 15th season of the competition.

Table

References 

GFF Elite League seasons
Guyana
football
football